Warslow and Elkstones is a civil parish in the district of Staffordshire Moorlands, Staffordshire, England. It contains 22 listed buildings that are recorded in the National Heritage List for England. Of these, one is at Grade II*, the middle of the three grades, and the others are at Grade II, the lowest grade.  The parish contains the villages of Warslow and Elkstones, and is otherwise rural.  Most of the listed buildings are houses and associated structures, cottages, farmhouses and farm buildings.  The other listed buildings include two churches, a chapel, parts of a churchyard cross, and a bridge.


Key

Buildings

References

Citations

Sources

Lists of listed buildings in Staffordshire